This is a list of performers who have performed or been scheduled to perform on the Germania Insurance Amphitheater stage.

Culture of Austin, Texas
Germania Insurance Amphitheater performers